Hi-Q may refer to:

Hi-Q (band), a Romanian pop group
Hi-Q (game), a peg solitaire game
Hi-Q (production music), a library of production music
Delco Hi-Q, an American academic quiz competition

See also 
 Hiq (disambiguation)